Mojean Aria is an Australian actor, writer and producer. In 2017, he won the Heath Ledger Scholarship.

Early life and career
Aria was born in Sydney, Australia. He first started taking acting lessons at the age of six. He attended the National Institute of Dramatic Art (NIDA) at the age of fourteen in advanced (adult) classes. In 2004 he won a scholarship to The McDonald College High School of Performing Arts. In 2007 he landed a lead role in the feature film Cross Life directed by Claire McCarthy, which premiered at the Sydney Film Festival. He later relocated to Los Angeles.

Filmography

Film

Television

Awards and nominations

References

External links 

Australian male film actors
Australian male television actors
Australian people of Iranian descent
Living people
Male actors from Sydney
Year of birth missing (living people)